National Cultural Centre may refer to:

Ghana
 Centre for National Culture (Accra), Accra

Guyana
 National Cultural Centre (Guyana), Georgetown

Uganda
 Uganda National Cultural Centre, Kampala

United States
 John F. Kennedy Center for the Performing Arts or (until 1964) the National Cultural Center, Washington, D.C.
 National Hispanic Cultural Center, Albuquerque, New Mexico